The 2021–22 Israeli Basketball State Cup, for sponsorships reasons the Migdal State Cup, will be the 62nd edition of the Israeli Basketball State Cup, organized by the Israel Basketball Association.

On 10 May 2021, the Israel Basketball Association announced a change in the State Cup tournament format. only the first 8 teams at the end of the first rotation of the Israeli Basketball Premier League will compete in the State Cup and not all the teams participate in the Premier League and the Israeli Basketball National League.

On 31 October, 2021, the Israel Basketball Association announced that the draw for the tournament would be held on 28 December.

Qualified teams
The top eight ranking teams after the first rotation (11 rounds) of the 2021–22 Israeli Basketball Premier League regular season qualified to the tournament.

Bracket

Source:

Quarterfinals

Semifinals

Final

References

2021
Cup